MS Southward was a cruise ship owned by Norwegian Cruise Line, operated between 1971 and 1994, and later on to other cruise liners until she ended operation in 2013.

History
Southward was NCL's fourth cruise ship, the others being Sunward (1966), Starward (1968), and Skyward (1969). Initially, she was operated on Caribbean cruises out of Miami. In 1987, however, she was dispatched to the west coast of the United States to begin operating out of Los Angeles (San Pedro) on three and four-night cruises to Catalina Island, San Diego and Ensenada, BC, Mexico. As a result of this move, Norwegian Caribbean Line changed its name to Norwegian Cruise Line (NCL) in late 1987.

The Southward was featured on episodes 315 and 316 of Baywatch, which originally aired on January 25, 1993 and February 1, 1993 respectively.

By 1994, she was sold off to Sun Cruises, a cruise division of the UK-based travel company Airtours, and renamed Seawing. She cruised for seven nights through the Mediterranean during the spring/summer season and the Far East in the winter season. Later on, Seawing ran fourteen, sixteen, and thirty-night cruises from 2002 and 2003.

From 2004, she joined the Louis Cruise Lines fleet, under the name of Perla. In 2005, she operated cruises out of Piraeus to the Greek Islands and Turkey, after a winter in the Far East. In May 2008, she was chartered to Golden Sun Cruises (a Greece-based company) and renamed The Aegean Pearl, operating between three and four night cruises from Piraeus. After the charter ended with Golden Sun Cruises in 2009, she returned to Louis Cruises with her name remaining unchanged.

In 2010, she was transferred to Rio Cruises and renamed Rio, and again in 2012, was sold off to Venus Cruise Lines and renamed Venus. She was scrapped in 2013.

References

Ocean liners
Ships built in Italy
Ships of Norwegian Cruise Line
Passenger ships of Norway
1971 ships